Kilgobbin Cross is a high cross and National Monument located in Stepaside, County Dublin, Ireland.

Location

History

The townland of Kilgobbin takes its name from a St Goban, of which there appear to have been many in Ireland (the hagiographies are confused). The depiction of Jesus wearing a long cloak places the cross in the 10th century AD. The cross was buried in the graveyard and unearthed c. 1800.

Description

It is a Celtic cross with one side broken off. An inscription on the east face shows the Crucifixion of Jesus, with Jesus wearing a long robe. Unusually, there is a bullaun stone set into the cross's base.

References

National Monuments in County Dublin
High crosses in the Republic of Ireland